Gauzelin (died 7 September 962) was a French Roman Catholic prelate who served as the Bishop of Toul from 922 until his death. He has been named as a saint.

Life
Gauzelin was born to noble Frankish parents. He first served as part of notaries in the French kingdom from 913 to circa 919 which later led to King Charles naming him as the Bishop of Toul; Pope John X confirmed the appointment and he received his episcopal consecration on 17 March 922 from Ruotger. Gauzelin promoted discipline for the monasteries and for diocesan priests and tried to defend the church against secular threats.

The damage from the Danish and Hungarian invasions saw him become a reforming bishop in his diocese as well as the founder of a number of monasteries. These new monasteries included one at Bouxières-aux-Dames (built c. 935–936) which became associated with his noble household and where he was later buried.

Death
Bishop Gauzelin died on 7 September 962. There is a cathedral that continues to preserve a number of objects associated with him.

References

External links
 Santi e Beati
 Catholic Hierarchy

962 deaths
10th-century Christian saints
10th-century people from West Francia
Bishops of Toul
Saints of West Francia
Year of birth unknown